Herbert Thomas may refer to:

 Herbert Joseph Thomas (1918–1943),  United States Marine Corps sergeant and Medal of Honor recipient
 Herbert Henry Thomas (1876–1935), British geologist
 Bert Thomas (Herbert Samuel Thomas, 1883–1966), British political cartoonist
 Herb Thomas (Herbert Watson Thomas, 1923–2000), NASCAR driver
 Herb Thomas (outfielder) (Herbert Mark Thomas, 1902–1991), baseball player and manager
 Herb Thomas (pitcher) (Herb Thomas, born 1910), Negro league baseball player
 Bon Thomas (Herbert Arthur Thomas, 1911–1995), Australian politician

See also

Bert Thomas (disambiguation)